Erythrina subumbrans is a flowering plant species in the genus Erythrina.

The pterocarpans phaseolin, erybraedins A and B are found in the stems of E. subumbrans.

References

External links 

subumbrans
Plants described in 1858